Ashaval or  Ashapalli or  Yashoval is the first name of Ahmedabad or Amdavad. Archaeological evidence suggests that the area around Ahmedabad in the state of Gujarat, India has been inhabited since the 11th century, when it was known as Yashoval or Ashapalli or Ashaval. The city of Ashaval was located on the east of River Sabarmati. Existence of Ashawal is traced way back in 9th - 10th century up till 13th century.

The settlement near the bank of Sabarmati river, which is today the city of Ahmedabad, was earlier known as Ashaval or Ashapalli. In the tenth century Ashaval was one of the chief places in Gujarat as described by Al-Biruni. It was a well peopled, busy, trading, manufacturing and rich town around 1150.

Area 
The estimated area of Ashawal was from Calico Mills via Jamalpur Darwaja up to Astodia Darwaja. The hillock near Astodia Darwaja (the present Dhal-ni-pol area) was known as 'Asha Bhil-no-Tekro'.

Rulers 

Ashaval was originally ruled by a Bhil Maharaja Aasha Bhil, who was defeated by the Chaulukya(Solanki) king Karna (r. c. 1064–1092 CE). The 14th century chronicler Merutunga states that Karna established the city of Karnavati after this victory, which is identified with modern  Ahmedabad by some scholars.

References

History of Gujarat
History of Ahmedabad